The National Pulse Memorial and Museum is a planned memorial and museum commemorating victims of the Orlando nightclub shooting at Pulse in 2016, originally planned to open in 2022.

In 2021 the site was designated by Congress as a national memorial.

Temporary memorial efforts
In an effort to honor the 49 victims and to memorialize the location surrounding the Pulse Nightclub building, the City of Orlando dedicated $4,518 to erect a barrier fence to fulfill this purpose. Following this, the City discussed purchasing the Nightclub for $2.25 million, but the vote was postponed.

In the end, Pulse Nightclub owner, Barbara Poma, cited personal and emotional connection to the site as the main reasons as to why she chose not to sell the property. Since this time, Poma and others have been raising funds for a memorial, museum, and scholarships through her nonprofit, the onePULSE Foundation.

Design and construction
The onePULSE Foundation released a request for proposals in March 2019, with proposals being due by January 31, 2020. Six finalists were selected from the total 68 submissions received, with the final design being chosen from Coldefy & Associes with RDAI. The selection process was completed by a blue-ribbon jury made up of representatives from onePulse, the Orlando community, architect professionals, and others. The decision was made as a collective group, with consideration in mind to the over 2,300 comments that were submitted from the victims' families, survivors, and the community with recommendations for memorial concepts.

The current design includes several pieces that come together to form a community presence and dedicated reflective, interactive, and connective spaces. The National Pulse Memorial has the focus of serving as a quiet and peaceful garden setting, and is set to include different symbolic features such as 49 trees, 49 color lines, and a reflecting pool surrounding the Pulse building, to honor the 49 victims lost in the events of the Pulse shooting. A separate museum will be located at 438 West Kaley Street, Orlando, FL 32806, and will be erected in a shape representing a growing flower. The museum will serve as an interactive center to learn, gather, and host community programming. In total, the project is set to cost $45 million to complete. Entrance to the memorial will be free year-round, but the museum will have an admission charge. Architectural renderings and videos have been made available to the public to view and comment on the onePULSE foundation's website.

The plans have received some criticism from survivors and families of victims for being too large and expensive, as well as due to unpermitted renovations and code violations documented at the nightclub at the time of the shooting.

See also

 List of LGBT monuments and memorials
 List of museums in Florida
 List of national memorials of the United States

References

LGBT in Florida
LGBT monuments and memorials in the United States
Museums in Orlando, Florida
Monuments and memorials in Florida
Orlando nightclub shooting
Proposed monuments and memorials in the United States